William McLean (August 10, 1794 – October 12, 1839) was a lawyer, legislator and businessman. He served three terms in the U.S. House of Representatives from 1823 to 1829.

Biography 
William McLean was born in Mason County, Kentucky and moved in 1799 with his parents Fergus and Sophia (Blackford) McLean and his older brother John McLean (who would become a Congressman from Ohio and a Justice of the U.S. Supreme Court) to a farm in Warren County, Ohio.  There he attended the common schools, studied law and was admitted to the bar in 1814.  He commenced practice in Cincinnati, Ohio and then was a lawyer at Lebanon, Ohio.

He removed from Lebanon to Piqua, Ohio about 1820 and was the first regular professional lawyer who settled in the village.  He was receiver of public moneys and through his efforts a subsidy of 500,000 acres (2000 km2) of land was procured for building the Ohio Canal from Cincinnati to Lake Erie.

Congress 
In 1822, William McLean was elected from Ohio's 3rd congressional district, which covered nearly all Western Ohio north of Warren County.  He took his seat in the Eighteenth Congress.  He was reelected to the Nineteenth, and Twentieth Congresses.  In the Twentieth Congress, he served as chairman of the House Committee on Indian Affairs.

Later career and death 
William McLean returned to Cincinnati where he engaged in mercantile pursuits and the practice of law.  He was also interested in agricultural pursuits.  When his health began to fail, he retired from business and spent several months in Cuba hoping to derive benefit for his pulmonary disease by a change of climate.  His condition did not improve, and after returning to Cincinnati, he spent some time in revisiting several points in his old Congressional district.

William McLean died at his home in Cincinnati and was interred in the Catharine Street Burying Ground.  In 1863, he was reinterred in Spring Grove Cemetery.

External links

William McLean at Find A Grave

References 
 
 The History of Miami County, Ohio, Chicago: W.H. Beers & Co., 1880, 854 pgs.
 Reis, Jim. "Dred Scott jurist had strong ties to N. Kentucky; Pieces of the Past"  Cincinnati Post, September 22, 1997.

1794 births
1839 deaths
People from Lebanon, Ohio
Politicians from Cincinnati
Ohio lawyers
Burials at Spring Grove Cemetery
Ohio National Republicans
19th-century American politicians
Democratic-Republican Party members of the United States House of Representatives from Ohio
National Republican Party members of the United States House of Representatives
People from Mason County, Kentucky
19th-century American lawyers

pt:William Mclean